The Buenos Aires Challenger was a tennis tournament held in Buenos Aires, Argentina. The event is part of the ATP Challenger Tour and is played on outdoor clay courts, in Buenos Aires Lawn Tennis Club.

Finals

Singles

Doubles

References

External links 

1980 establishments in Argentina
2001 disestablishments in Argentina
ATP Challenger Tour
Clay court tennis tournaments
Recurring sporting events established in 1980
Recurring sporting events disestablished in 2001
Sports competitions in Buenos Aires
Tennis tournaments in Argentina